Émile Scaremberg (26 April 1863 – 26 February 1938) was a French tenor.

Biography 
Scaremberg (sometime spelled Scaramberg) was born in Besançon in Franche-Comté. After studying in Paris, he took singing lessons in the Comtoise capital with a tenor known as Perrin and continued his studies with Charles Nicot (1843–1899). Scaremberg made his début at the  Théâtre national de l'Opéra-Comique in April 1893 in Grétry's "Richard Coeur-de-Lion" and stayed with the company for two years. He also began to appear in opera houses in the cities of Bordeaux, Lyon (where he sang Werther), Marseille, Nantes, Nice and Vichy and, in 1894, he sang Turiddu in Monte-Carlo. He is included in one of the greatest compilation of classical singing, The EMI Record of Singing. He participated in many performances, as in London and Belgium, before sudden vocal difficulties forced him to return to Besançon to teach singing.

References

External links 
 Émile Scaramberg on Forgotten opera singers 
 Émile Scaramberg on Discogs
 Émile Scaramberg - Pagliacci (1905) on YouTube

1863 births
1938 deaths
Musicians from Besançon
French operatic tenors
19th-century French male singers
French music educators